There is great variety in dance in the United States of America. It is the home of the hip hop dance, salsa, swing, tap dance and its derivative Rock and Roll, and modern square dance (associated with the United States of America due to its historic development in that country—twenty three U.S. states have designated it as their official state dance or official folk dance) and one of the major centers for modern dance. There is a variety of social dance and concert or performance dance forms with also a range of traditions of Native American dances.

The reality shows and competitions So You Think You Can Dance, America's Best Dance Crew, and Dancing with the Stars, have broadened the audience for dance.

African American dance

African American dances are those vernacular dances which have developed within African American communities in everyday spaces, rather than in dance studios, schools or companies. African American vernacular dances are usually centered on social dance practice, though performance dance and concert dance often supply complementary aspects to social dancing.

Placing great value on improvisation, African American vernacular dances are characterized by ongoing change and development. Because they exist in social spaces and their main 'purpose' is self-expression, they are continually changing to reflect the needs, interests and personalities of their participants.

Alvin Ailey and the Alvin Ailey American Dance Theater is an important example of African American involvement in performance or concert dance.

Swing dance

The term "swing dance" refers to a group of dances that developed concurrently with jazz music in the 1920s, 30s and 40s. The most iconic among the various styles of swing dance is the lindy hop, which originated in Harlem and is still danced today. While the majority of swing dances began in African-American communities as vernacular African-American dances, some forms, like Balboa, developed within Euro-American or other ethnic group communities.

Dances such as the Black Bottom, Charleston, Shag, and Tap Dance travelled north with Dixieland jazz to New York, Kansas City, and Chicago in the Great Migration (African American) of the 1920s, where rural blacks travelled to escape persecution, Jim Crow laws, lynching and unemployment in the South (during the Great Depression).

Swinging jazz music features the syncopated timing associated with African American and West African music and dance—a combination of crotchets and quavers which many swing dancers interpret as 'triple steps' and 'steps' — yet also introduces changes in the way these rhythms were played—a distinct delay or 'relaxed' approach to timing.

Swing dance is now found globally, with great variety in their preferences for particular dances.

Modern dance

American modern dance developed in the early 20th century alongside American music. Among the pioneers of modern dance were Isadora Duncan, the dance company of Ruth St. Denis and her husband-partner, Ted Shawn, and their pupils Doris Humphrey and Martha Graham. The early modern dance makers broke with European classical forms by giving into the weight of gravity, initiating movement from the center rather than the limbs, and emphasizing an emotional directness in their choreography. Many of Graham's most popular works were produced in collaboration with leading American composers -- "Appalachian Spring" with Aaron Copland, for example.

Later choreographers, Merce Cunningham introduced chance procedures and composition by field, and Alvin Ailey incorporated African dance elements and black music into his works. Recently, Mark Morris and Liz Lerman have shown that graceful, exciting movement is not restricted by age or body type.

Dance and society

Dance is ingrained in society through events, the media, and awards like the Grammy awards, the Golden Globes, and the MTV video music awards which feature dancing.

Some popular competition televised events that are made for dance are Dancing with the Stars, So You Think You Can Dance and America's Best Dance Crew. These dancing shows allow society to interact with them, choosing who they think suits best in the competition.

Popular songs like Michael Jackson's "Thriller", The Harlem Shake, and "Teach me how to dougie" have influenced dance moves that became trends in society. In social gatherings people may dance folk dances, ballroom dances, casual dances, or modern dances like hip-hop.

American folk dances

Other American dances

Noted dancers

Companies

Ballet companies

Other companies

Former dance companies
Merce Cunningham Dance Company

Dance education
The Juilliard School
National Dance Education Organization
The Conservatory of Dance

Festivals
American Dance Festival
Jacob's Pillow is a home for dance in the United States founded by Ted Shawn and Ruth St. Denis, were America's leading dance couple. It is a National Historic Landmark located in the town of Becket, Massachusetts, in the Berkshires. It encompasses an internationally acclaimed summer dance festival (the first and longest-running in the United States), a professional school, rare and extensive archives, an intern program, and year-round community programs.
Fall for Dance Festival
DanceAfrica

See also
Modern dance in the United States
National Museum of Dance and Hall of Fame
Performing arts presenters
List of U.S. state dances

References

 
Articles containing video clips